Milorad M. Petrović-Seljančica (26 July 1875 in Velika Ivanča – 17 April 1921 in Belgrade) was a Serbian poet, playwright and soldier. Many of his poems were turned into songs.

Biography 
After finishing teacher's college in Aleksinac, Milorad Petrović became a high school teacher. He married his high school sweetheart, Ruža (Rose) Knežević, who was also a teacher and they had children. They both taught in village schools in Krčmar, Stojnik, Ranilović, and Mladenovac. He established himself in Belgrade and, at the age of 32, after having authored several books of poetry, began writing for the stage. Between 1907 and 1912 he wrote more than 300 poems that were transcribed into lyrical songs for the theater and became the most conspicuous poet of the day. His copiousness and speed of composition—together with his bohemian habits—became proverbial: the writer Janko Veselinović recalled how proudly Milorad Petrović wore his Serbian national costume, then only worn by peasants and not city folk (hence, the nickname "Seljančica"). His songs were swayable to such an extent that they have become a musical inspiration to all contemporary composers including to Isidor Bajić, Kosta Manojlović, Petar Krstić, Miloje Milojević, Stevan Hristić, Stevan Mokranjac, Stanislav Binički, and others.

With the on-set of the First Balkan War of 1912 he joined his fellow Serbs against the ancestral enemies of his country. He did the same a year later when the Bulgarians provoked the Second Balkan War of 1913 and the tragic Great War that followed. After the conflicts, separated from his wife and children, he lived in Kruševac and Belgrade where his health suddenly began to deteriorate. His health had been failing since his mid-thirties while fighting on the battlefields (1912–1915), retreating over the Albanian mountains (winter, 1915–1916), and continued fighting (1917–1918). After victory was declared, Petrović somehow found the energy to live for a few more years. He died of tuberculosis at the age of 46 on the 17th of April 1921. He purportedly predicted the exact date of his own death on the 3rd of March 1921 to his wife Ruža, who was at his bedside throughout his last few weeks.

Works 
In the group of works, the cycle Seljaničice (Little Peasant Girls), which was based on verses of Milorad Petrović, attained a special place. The poems (most of which were transcribed into music) composed in the folk idiom were used by Milorad Petrović in his dramatic play Čučuk-Stana (1907). He is remembered for a book of verse entitled Vaskrsenje (Resurrection). Literary critic Jovan Skerlić praised Milorad Petrović's Vaskrsenje as a work which excited and delighted readers.

References

Sources 
 

1875 births
1921 deaths
People from Mladenovac
Serbian male poets